Acleris sinica is a species of moth of the family Tortricidae. It is found in China (Tien-Mu-Shan).

References

Moths described in 1966
sinica
Moths of Asia